SuperCalc is a CP/M-80 spreadsheet application published by Sorcim in 1980.

History 
VisiCalc was the first spreadsheet program but its release for the CP/M operating system ran only on the HP-125, Sharp MZ80, and the Sony SMC-70. SuperCalc was created to fill that void and market opportunity. Alongside WordStar, it was one of the CP/M applications bundled with the Osborne 1 portable computer. It quickly became popular and was ported to MS-DOS in 1982.

An improvement over VisiCalc (though using much the same command structure using the slash key), SuperCalc was one of the first spreadsheet programs capable of iteratively solving circular references (cells that depend on each other's results).  It would be over 10 years after the introduction of SuperCalc before this feature was implemented in Microsoft Excel, although in Lotus 1-2-3, manual programming of iterative logic could also be used to solve this issue. According to the SuperCalc product manager, iterative calculations were added when Sorcim changed from binary-coded decimal to binary math. Since the precision of the two math packages was different, some IF statements resolved differently, and iterative calculations helped solve this problem.

Versions of SuperCalc were later released for the Apple II, for PCs running MS-DOS, and, after Sorcim was bought by CA Technologies (CA) in 1985, for Microsoft Windows (under the name CA-SuperCalc). SuperCalc was CA Technologies' first personal computer product. The MS-DOS versions were more popular with many users than the market-leading Lotus 1-2-3, because it was distributed without copy protection, as well as being priced lower.

By the release of version 3 in March 1987, a million users were claimed. New versions were published into the early 1990s, after which Microsoft Excel dominated the spreadsheet market.

In 1993, the Ministry of Railway of Russia signed an agreement with CA Technologies after a Russian employee illegally used SuperCalc for government purposes.

Versions 
1980: SuperCalc
SuperCalc 2, which featured a novelty: Split screen with formulas on one side, and graphs on the other
1986: SuperCalc 4, evaluated #2 on the spreadsheets market after Excel, with introduction of automatic construction of macros
 1989: SuperCalc 5

References

External links 
 SuperCalc 1.00 running on an IBM PC Model 5150 at the System Source Computer Museum.

Spreadsheet software
Microcomputer software
CP/M software
DOS software
Presentation software for Windows
1980 software